Yuliana Vasileva Yaneva is a Bulgarian freestyle wrestler. She is a two-time medalist at the European Wrestling Championships.

Career 

In 2019, she competed in the women's 65 kg event at the World Wrestling Championships held in Nur-Sultan, Kazakhstan. In 2020, she won the gold medal in the women's 72 kg event at the Individual Wrestling World Cup held in Belgrade, Serbia.

In March 2021, she competed at the European Qualification Tournament hoping to qualify for the 2020 Summer Olympics in Tokyo, Japan. She won her first match against Buse Tosun of Turkey but then lost her next match against Koumba Larroque of France which meant that she could no longer qualify for the Olympics at this tournament.

She won the silver medal in the women's 72 kg event at the 2021 European Wrestling Championships held in Warsaw, Poland.

In February 2022, she won the gold medal in the women's 72 kg event at the Dan Kolov & Nikola Petrov Tournament held in Veliko Tarnovo, Bulgaria. In April 2022, she won one of the bronze medals in the 72 kg event at the European Wrestling Championships held in Budapest, Hungary.

Achievements

References

External links 
 

Living people
Year of birth missing (living people)
Place of birth missing (living people)
Bulgarian female sport wrestlers
European Wrestling Championships medalists
21st-century Bulgarian women